The Taillé aux greubons is a salted bakery specialty from Vaud, in Switzerland. "Greubon" is a Swiss term for the crackling produced as residue from rendering lard.

The taillés are made of puff pastry with the greubons embedded in them.

References

Swiss cuisine
Culinary Heritage of Switzerland
Ark of Taste foods